Lisa Pasold is a Canadian poet from Montreal. She is most noted for her 2012 poetry collection Any Bright Horse, which was shortlisted for the Governor General's Award for English-language poetry at the 2012 Governor General's Awards.

She has also published the poetry collections Weave (2004) and A Bad Year for Journalists (2006), and the novel Rats of Las Vegas (2009).

References

External links

21st-century Canadian novelists
21st-century Canadian poets
Canadian women novelists
Canadian women poets
Living people
21st-century Canadian women writers
Year of birth missing (living people)